Gymnastics at the 2020 Summer Olympics in Tokyo was held in three categories: artistic gymnastics, rhythmic gymnastics and trampolining. All gymnastics events were staged at the Olympic Gymnastic Centre, Tokyo in 2021.

The programme for 2020 remained unchanged from 2016, despite an application from the FIG for the admission of a new parkour based event. The application had proved contentious with specialist parkour or freerunning organisations lobbying for the sport not to be included, and to be recognized as an entirely separate sport from gymnastics.

Originally planned as a temporary venue, in 2016, the Tokyo 2020 authorities confirmed the Olympic Gymnastic Centre would become a permanent venue, functioning as a convention centre after the Games. Before its refurbishment, the venue was also expected to host the Boccia event at the 2020 Summer Paralympics.

There was one unbroken tie in artistic gymnastics: bronze in the women's floor final.

Qualification

The qualification pathway for the 2020 Summer Olympics was significantly overhauled and modified from 2016. The men's and women's team events in artistic gymnastics were reduced from five members per team to four, while further allocations were available for up to two specialists.

In a further move to link several FIG competitions to the Olympic Games, qualification places will now be available based on an aggregate of scores achieved over the Artistic Gymnastics World Cup series, and the various continental artistic gymnastics championships.

Schedule

Participation

Participating nations
Japan, as the host country, receives a guaranteed spot, in case it were not to earn one by the regular qualifying methods.

 (host)

Medal summary

Medal table

Artistic gymnastics
Men

Women

Rhythmic gymnastics

Trampoline

See also
Gymnastics at the 2018 Asian Games
Gymnastics at the 2018 Commonwealth Games
Gymnastics at the 2018 Summer Youth Olympics
Gymnastics at the 2019 African Games
Gymnastics at the 2019 European Games
Gymnastics at the 2019 Pan American Games
Gymnastics at the 2019 Summer Universiade

References

External links
 Fédération Internationale de Gymnastique
 Results book – Artistic Gymnastics. olympics.com. 
 Results book – Rhythmic Gymnastics. olympics.com. 
 Results book – Trampoline Gymnastics. olympics.com. 
 Artistic Gymnastics at the 2020 Summer Olympics at Olympedia
 Rhythmic Gymnastics at the 2020 Summer Olympics at Olympedia
 Trampolining at the 2020 Summer Olympics at Olympedia

 
2020 Summer Olympics events

2020
Gymnastics competitions in Japan
2021 in gymnastics